Everybody Dance Now  is a Dutch entertainment dance format from FremantleMedia’s Blue Circle involving iconic visual dance floors and open auditions making dance accessible to everyone. The Dance Floor is the iconic, visual thread that features throughout the series from auditions to the finale. After every dance performance, the verdict of the judges is delivered by the dance floor… Red, it’s all over…Green and the act goes on. Dancers from any style and age, from individuals to crews, must WOW the judges, the studio audience and of course, viewers at home because, on this dance floor, there are no second chances.

If a contestant dances well and the judges give Green… the dance act then finds out what percentage of the studio audience liked them. This gives a ranking of all acts that get through to the next stage which becomes important as, the higher the score, the greater the chance to make it to the live shows.
 
In the Ranking, Round contestants must perform in the order of the ranking. A red or a green dance floor instantly decides their fate. As soon as
all the slots are filled the show is over.
 
In the live shows, viewers will decide who goes to the final but to make it through to the viewers’ vote, their performance must first secure a Green floor from the judges. The home viewer has the final say in the grand finale.

Broadcast History
Series one aired on RTL4 from 22 February to 12 April 2013 in the Netherlands. The finale episode took the No.1 spot of the day with a series peak of 1.9m viewers. Overall, the first series averaged 1.6m viewers across the series, with a 20% audience share, exceeding the RTL4 primetime average by +12%.

The show was commissioned for a second series on RTL4 which aired from 28 February to 18 April 2014. The show launched as the highest-rated entertainment show of the day across all channels. The total audience share for the series was +44% higher than RTL4’s primetime average.
 
Commissioned for a third series – news just in today from the local team!
The format was sold in Thailand where it launched on Channel 3 on 5 October 2013, performing +20% above the broadcaster’s slot average. The youngest contestant in the competition Stefano was the winner of the show and took home the 1 million baht prize.

Dutch reality television series
Everybody Dance Now
Dance competition television shows
Television series by Fremantle (company)
RTL 4 original programming